Deltacephalaspis is an extinct genus of trilobites in the order Phacopida. It contains four species, D. comis, D. magister, D. retrospina, and D. tumida. Fossils of the genus have been found in the Belén, Icla and Gamoneda Formations of Bolivia and the Gydo Formation of South Africa.

References 

Calmoniidae
Phacopida genera
Emsian life
Devonian trilobites of Africa
Fossils of South Africa
Devonian trilobites of South America
Devonian Bolivia
Fossils of Bolivia
Fossil taxa described in 1979